The Eureka Classis was part of the Reformed Church in the United States (RCUS).  It existed from 1910 to 1985.  From 1940 until in 1985 the Eureka Classis served as the continuing RCUS as the rest of the denomination had merged into the new denomination, the Evangelical and Reformed Church.  On May 6, 1986, the Eureka Classis was called to order and immediately dissolved to form the Synod of the Reformed Church in the United States.

Origins 

From 1870 until about 1902, America had a wave of German immigrants. These Germans came from the South of Russia where their ancestors had moved at the invitation of Catherine the Great. Many of these immigrants ended up in the Dakotas. At this time, the Reformed Church in the United States was also known as the German Reformed Church, so it was a logical denomination for the Reformed German-Russians to join. The RCUS at this time was in great turmoil on account of Mercersburg theology and the liturgical controversy that arose out of that. The German-Russians were against the innovations of Mercersburg. Since these immigrants still spoke German as their primary language, they used a clause in the Constitution of the RCUS to organize based on language rather than the tradition geography, yet, the real reason was to organize doctrinally.

On June 7, 1911, seven ministers and sixteen congregations organized to form the Eureka Classis.  The name of the Classis came from the Greek word ‘eureka’ which means ‘I found it’ and not on the town Eureka, South Dakota, where the second meeting of the Classis would be held.  The name was designed to mean that they had found a solution to their doctrinal problems with the rest of the denomination.

As the RCUS had talks with the Evangelical Synod of North America, the Eureka Classis protested. It opposed the union of the two churches officially in 1932. The Eureka Classis voted against the proposed constitution of the new church in 1936. In 1940, when the merger became official and the Evangelical and Reformed Church was formed (E&R), the Eureka Classis resolved to be the continuing RCUS. The Eureka Classis incorporated as the continuing Reformed Church in the United States in 1945 in the state of North Dakota. The Classis at that time consisted of ten pastors and twenty-eight churches.

Westminster Period 1953 to 1970 

The Eureka Classis had always been short on ministers.  The problem had gotten worse after the split with the E&R as now there was not a seminary that could be trusted to send young men to be trained for the ministry. Two of the leading ministers in the Eureka Classis, Rev. Walter Grossmann and Rev. William Korn, began encouraging people to attend Westminster Theological Seminary in Philadelphia.  In 1953, Lloyd Gross enrolled at Westminster and the Eureka Classis began a fruitful relationship with the seminary. Westminster not only trained young men from the RCUS, but sent other graduating students into the Eureka Classis to fill pulpits.  Rev. Norman Hoeflinger was one such man and he became the first graduate of Westminster to serve in the Eureka Classis.  This relationship with Westminster brought about a relationship with the Orthodox Presbyterian Church (OPC). Contact with non-German Calvinist churches helped open the mindset of the Eureka Classis to the outside world and the possibility of growth. In 1960, the Eureka Classis helped fund Harvey Conn of the OPC as a missionary. Also that year, the church saw statistics of fourteen pastors and twenty congregations.  Of that number at least five were Westminster graduates, and one was a transfer from the Orthodox Presbyterian Church. The relationship with Westminster ended in the early 70s as the controversy around Rev. Norman Shepherd, professor at Westminster, caused the RCUS pull away from Westminster Seminary. The Eureka Classis would consider many alternatives to Westminster such as Mid-America Reformed Seminary as well as considering starting their own seminary.

Final Years 1970-1985 

The Eureka Classis started to not only fund foreign missions, but began to get serious about home missions as well.  The Eureka Classis began outreach to churches and groups that were not from the German Calvinist heritage.  The Eureka Classis in 1970 had 22 ministers and 23 congregations.  By 1985, the Classis had grown to 32 congregations and 30 ministers.  In 1985 the Classis voted to dissolve at their next meeting into four classes and form a Synod of the Reformed Church in the United States. The number of churches and the fact that the RCUS now reached from California to Florida aided that decision.  A new constitution was approved, and in 1986, the Eureka Classis convened and dissolved into the Synod of the Reformed Church in the United States.

See also
Official RCUS Website
You Shall Be My People by R. Grossmann and N. Hoeflinger

References 

Presbyteries and classes